Pastebin.com is a text storage site. It was created on September 3, 2002 by Paul Dixon, and reached 1 million active pastes (excluding spam and expired pastes) eight years later, in 2010.

It features syntax highlighting for a variety of programming and markup languages, as well as view counters for pastes and user profiles. Users can submit pastes as guests without registration, but an account allows managing pastes.

History 

By October 2011, the site's active pastes numbers exceeded 10 million. In July 2012, the owners of Pastebin.com  tweeted that they had already surpassed the 20 million active pastes mark. On June 9, 2015, they announced they had reached 65 million active pastes. They also mentioned that around 75% of pastes are either unlisted or private.

During the 2014 Venezuelan protests, Pastebin.com was blocked by the country's government as one of the sites were used by activists sharing information pertaining to the protests.

In 2015, Pastebin.com reached 95 million active pastes, and more than 2 million members.

In April 2020, Pastebin.com removed their built-in search feature and restricted their web scraping API, including for paid lifetime subscribers of Pastebin Pro. As an additional spam prevention measure, pastes from users not logged in are hidden from the list of recent pastes, visible in the site's side bar.

In September 2020, two new features were added to the site. Users became able to password-protect pastes from viewing and request the paste be deleted immediately once viewed.

On October 14, 2020, the terms of service were updated and the mention that contributions were CC BY-SA was removed.

Pastebin.com is a popular source of dark web .onion links.

See also 
Snippet (programming)

References

External links
 
 Original source code

Internet properties established in 2002
File sharing services